David Allen Stover (born December 16, 1954) is an American politician serving as a member of the West Virginia Senate from the 9th district. Elected in November 2020, he assumed office on December 1, 2020.

Early life and education 
Stover was born in Mullens, West Virginia in 1954. After graduating from Mullens High School, he attended the West Virginia University Institute of Technology and earned a Bachelor of Arts degree in education and history from Glenville State College in 1977.

Career 
From 1977 to 1998, Stover worked as a public school teacher. Since 2005, he has served as a court clerk for the Wyoming County Courthouse and Jail. Stover was elected to the West Virginia Senate in November 2020 and assumed office on December 1, 2020. Stover serves as vice chair of the Senate Natural Resources Committee and Senate Interstate Cooperation Committee.

References 

1954 births
Living people
People from Wyoming County, West Virginia
Glenville State College alumni
Republican Party West Virginia state senators